The N2 road in Belgium is a road connecting Brussels and Maastricht passing Leuven, Diest and Hasselt. It starts in Brussels at the Madou crossroad on the small ring, heading northeast as the Chaussée de Louvain/Leuvensesteenweg, which crosses the municipalities of Saint-Josse-ten-Noode, City of Brussels, Schaerbeek, Evere and Woluwe-Saint-Lambert in Brussels, and then enter Flanders via the municipality of Zaventem, Flemish Brabant.

When the road enters the municipality of Herent it is named Brusselsesteenweg up to Leuven. When it leaves Leuven, the road is named Diestsesteenweg as it leads to Diest. It is then named successively Staatsbaan, Leuvensesteenweg, Diestsesteenweg, Staatsbaan, Leuvensesteenweg and Eduard Robeynslaan. When leaving Diest and entering Halen, the road enters the province of Limburg. At this point, the road (named Halensebaan) crosses the European route E314. The subsequent names of the road are: Staatsbaan, Grote Baan, Diestsesteenweg, Steenweg, Diestersteenweg, Kuringersteenweg. Just before entering Hasselt, the road crosses the European route E313.  When leaving Hasselt, it is named Diepenbekerweg, then Steenweg, Kapelstraat, Wijkstraat, Grendelbaan, Tipstraat, Beverststraat, Holt, Hasseltstestraat, Brugstraat, Maastrichterstraat, Bilzerbaan and Tweede Carabinierslaan. It then enters the Netherlands.

The road crosses in total 19 municipalities. 5 in the Brussels-capital Region, 8 in the province of Flemish Brabant and 6 in the province of Limburg. Full municipality list is available below, main municipalities are in bold.

Junction list

See also
 Transport in Belgium

References

002
Roads in Brussels